The Ministry of Agriculture of the Republic of Uzbekistan (Uzbek: O'zbekiston Respublikasi Qishlоq хo'jаligi vazirligi) is a government administration body in Uzbekistan that implements a unified policy in the field of agriculture and food security.

References

Agriculture
Government of Uzbekistan
Ministries established in 1996
1996 establishments in Uzbekistan